Eslam Mohamed (born 3 March 1990 in Giza, Egypt) is an Egyptian boxer. At the 2012 Summer Olympics, he competed in the Men's light welterweight, but was defeated in the first round by Gyula Káté.

References

Living people
Egyptian male boxers
Olympic boxers of Egypt
Boxers at the 2012 Summer Olympics
Competitors at the 2018 Mediterranean Games
Mediterranean Games bronze medalists for Egypt
Mediterranean Games medalists in boxing
1990 births
People from Giza
Light-welterweight boxers